The Azalea Park neighborhood is a community within City Heights in the greater San Diego, California area. It is located on top of a plateau 3 miles east of San Diego Bay, with an elevation of around 300 feet. It is bordered to the north by Manzanita Canyon (Lexington Street, officially a paper street at the bottom of the canyon) Fairmount Avenue to the east, Interstate 805 to the west, and Hollywood Park to the south.

Climate 
Azalea Park Neighborhood enjoys a very moderate climate, avoiding the overcast conditions along the coast and the extreme heat of the inland areas. A strong "ocean" breeze helps to keep Azalea Park cool in the summer due to its location at the edge of the plateau.

History 
Azalea Park was once, and still is "officially" known as Lexington Park. Azalea Park was a real estate subdivision, and in the mid-1980s the Lexington Park Neighborhood Association decided to begin using Azalea Park to refer to themselves. The Lexington Park Neighborhood Association soon disbanded due to members moving, dying, or otherwise losing interest.

In 1993, the newly formed Azalea Park Neighborhood Association began a decades-long campaign to recruit LGBT residents to Azalea Park to begin the transformation of the area from a crime-ridden area filled with drug houses and gangs into a family-friendly neighborhood.

Many residents have been in the community for 50 years or more. A large percentage of the homes in Azalea Park are owner-occupied. New arrivals have significantly improved both the physical appearance and the community spirit here.

"Project Clean leader Linda Pennington and her husband, Mark, moved to Azalea Park a decade ago from the Hillcrest neighborhood, the center of San Diego's gay community. The Penningtons had watched the gentrification that occurred in Hillcrest when gays and lesbians began buying homes. 'The gays rescued Hillcrest, and we hope they can help do the same far Azalea Park,' said Mark Pennington, a computer program administrator for AT&T. 'We know that gays are good neighbors, they take care of their property and they're community minded.'"

"In 1994, resident activist Linda Pennington sat on her porch after a Saturday of painting over graffiti with her husband and a few neighbors and remarked how great it would be if members of the San Diego gay community would move in. She had observed that Hillcrest, a neighborhood in San Diego popular with homosexual couples, seemed to suddenly prosper and thrive. That was the start of an effort to target market a group of potential homeowners that has been 'wildly successful,' said Pennington, whose efforts sent her and other residents to Gay Pride marches to set up booths and actively recruit homosexuals to move to Azalea Park. They made a match between having not-so-great schools but a good housing stock and the thought that if they offered an environment that was welcoming to this particular population — households with no children and reasonably high incomes — it could have a revitalizing effect on the neighborhood."

The target marketing worked. Since 1994, the gay population of Azalea Park has increased dramatically, occupying 100 of the 800 housing units.

Jim Doolittle, an unemployed bill collector and nine-year resident, said: "Gays take care of their homes, there's no other way to put it. They keep up their yards and they tend to be community active. We don't care about their sexual orientation at all."

To spread the message of Azalea Park, Pennington and a dozen other residents marched in the city's annual Lesbian & Gay Pride Parade in Hillcrest under the banner "Azalea Park. An Affordable Canyon Neighborhood."

There is a tradition of strong community involvement. In addition the residents regularly join together for canyon clean-ups, neighborhood paint-outs, toy drives and other community related activities. Azalea Park has one of the largest and most active neighborhood associations in San Diego.

Azalea Park is blossoming into the Azalea Park Arts District (APAD). Visitors can find sculptures, art installations, murals and hand-painted signs to denote the flower-named streets. The Manzanita Gathering Place was built to be a creative refuge awash in art at the opening at Manzanita Canyon, with canopies and columns incorporating mosaic tiles made by Azalea Park residents. Local artists have moved their businesses to Azalea Park and see this neighborhood becoming a vibrant arts community. At the Azalea Community Park, local artists have created a unique oasis with the Water Conservation Garden, a collection of succulent plants and creative sculpture.

References

External links
 www.azaleapark.org

Neighborhoods in San Diego